List of Israeli politicians, notable enough for Wikipedia articles.

A 

 Aharon Abuhatzera, former minister, head of the National Religious Party
 Yosef Almogi, former minister and mayor of Haifa
 Yigal Allon, former general, government minister
 Shulamit Aloni, founder of Human Rights party, former minister in 1974, 1992–1996
 Meir Amit, former general, minister, head of Mossad
 Yehuda Amital, Rabbi, former minister without portfolio, leader of Meimad
 Shaul Amor, former minister, candidate for presidency
 Zalman Aran, former minister
 Shoshana Arbeli-Almozlino, former health minister
 Moshe Arens, former minister of defense, former ambassador to the U.S.
 Yoram Aridor, former minister
 Colette Avital, Israeli diplomat, former member of Knesset
 Shmuel Avital, former minister
 Ruhama Avraham, former MK
 Rachel Azaria, Deputy Mayor of Jerusalem

B 

 Haim Bar-Lev, former Chief of Staff, minister, ambassador to Russia
 Yisrael Bar-Yehuda (1895–1965), former minister, divorced from Beba Idelson
 Ehud Barak (b. 1942), former chief of staff, Israeli Prime Minister 1999–2001
 Moshe Baram, former minister
 Uzi Baram, former minister, son of Moshe Baram
 Nir Barkat, mayor of Jerusalem
 Yisrael Barzilai, former minister
 Benny Begin, former minister, son of Prime Minister Menachem Begin
 Menachem Begin (1913–1992), former head of Irgun, Prime Minister 1977–1983, Nobel Peace Prize 1978
 Yossi Beilin, former Labor party minister, leader of Meretz-Yachad
 Yitzhak Ben-Aharon (b. 1906), former minister, former Histadrut leader
 Shlomo Ben-Ami, former foreign affairs minister, ambassador, professor
 Binyamin Ben-Eliezer, former defense minister
 David Ben-Gurion (1886–1973), founder of Israel, first Prime Minister of Israel 1948–1953, 1954–1963
 Mordechai Ben-Porat, former minister without portfolio
 Yitzhak Ben-Zvi, second President of Israel
 Shlomo Benizri, former minister
 Naftali Bennett, minister of education, leader of The Jewish Home, thirteenth Prime Minister of Israel 2021-present
 Mordechai Bentov, first minister of construction and housing
 Yitzhak Berman, former minister, former Speaker of Knesset
 Peretz Bernstein, former minister
 Azmi Bishara, Arab-Israeli MP & head of Balad party
 Victor Breilovsky, was minister of science and technology for 4 days
 Yosef Burg, Rabbi, former minister, leader of the National Religious Party

C 
 Moshe Carmel, former party leader and army commander, former transportation minister
 Naomi Chazan, former MK, representing Meretz, human rights activist
 Haim Cohn, former Attorney General, former justice minister, former Supreme Court justice, former State Attorney
 Geula Cohen, former deputy minister, founder of Tehyia party
 Raanan Cohen, former minister of labour 
 Rachel Cohen-Kagan, chairman of WIZO, signed declaration of independence, MK
 Ran Cohen, Knesset member for Meretz-Yachad, former minister of industry and commerce
 Yitzhak Cohen, former minister, from Shas party
 Yigal Cohen-Orgad, former minister
 Ruth Colian, founder and head of the U'Bizchutan party

D 
 Nissim Dahan, former health minister
 Moshe Dayan, former chief of staff, defense and foreign minister
 Yael Dayan, former Knesset member, active feminist, deputy mayor of Tel Aviv
 Aryeh Deri, former minister, leader of Shas party
 Ben-Zion Dinur, former minister of education, professor
 Sara Doron, former minister without portfolio
 Aryeh Leib Dulchin, former minister, former chairman of Jewish Agency

E 
 Abba Eban (1915–2002), diplomat and Foreign Minister of Israel 1966–1974
 Yuli-Yoel Edelstein, former minister of immigrant absorption
 Rafael Edri, former minister
 Simha Ehrlich, former finance minister
 Effi Eitam, Israeli general, leader of the Renewed Religious National Zionist party, former minister
 Michael Eitan, former minister of Science and Technology
 Rafael Eitan (1929–2004), former Chief of Staff, former minister
 Binyamin Elon, former minister, leader of Moledet party
 Tamar Eshel, Israeli representative in several UN organizations, member of Knesset
 Levi Eshkol, former Prime Minister of Israel 1963–1969
 Gideon Ezra, former minister

F 
 Moshe Feiglin, Deputy Speaker of the Knesset
 Shmuel Flatto-Sharon, MK 8th Knesset 1977-81

G 
 Yisrael Galili (1911–1986), former minister
 Gila Gamliel, minister of senior citizens
 Inbal Gavriely, youngest person elected to Knesset
 Yaakov Geri, former Minister of Industry and Commerce
 Yael German, MK
 Akiva Govrin, former minister of Tourism
 Tamar Gozansky, former member of Knesset for communist party
 Yitzhak Gruenbaum, first Minister of Interior
 Haika Grossman, member of Knesset, first woman to head of a regional council
 Pesach Grupper, former Minister of Agriculture
 Mordechai Gur, former Chief of Staff, former minister
 Haim Gvati, former minister

H 
 Zevulun Hammer, former minister, leader of National Religious Party
 Tzachi Hanegbi, member of government. Son of Geula Cohen
 Michael Harish. former minister of industry and commerce
 Gideon Hausner, former justice minister, attorney at the Eichmann trial
 Yaakov Michael Hazani, former minister
 Chaim Herzog, former general and diplomat, sixth President of Israel, born Vivian Herzog in Belfast, UK
 Isaac Herzog, member of government, son of President Chaim Herzog
 Shlomo Hillel, former minister, former Speaker of Knesset
 Tzipi Hotovely, viceminister of foreign affairs
 Yigal Hurvitz, former finance minister
 Abba Hushi (1898–1969), politician and mayor of Haifa 1951–1969

I 
 Beba Idelson, leader of the Pioneer Women movement. Member of Knesset
 Feige Ilanit, member of first Knesset, mother of Uri Ilan
 Dalia Itzik, member of the government

K
Avigdor Kahalani, former minister of internal security 1996–1999, general
Meir Kahane, founder of the Kach party (subsequently banned) (assassinated)
Moshe Kahlon, minister of finance, leader of Kulanu
Eliezer Kaplan, first finance minister
Moshe Katsav (b. 1945), former President of Israel (2000–2007)
Yisrael Katz, former minister of labour (1974–1977) 
Yisrael Katz, minister of agriculture since 2003, of Likud party
Berl Katznelson 
Avraham Katz-Oz, former minister of agriculture
Yisrael Kessar, former Histadrut leader, minister of transportation
Michael Kleiner, leader of Herut
Moshe Kol, former minister
Haim Korfo, former minister

L 
 Haim Landau, former minister
 Uzi Landau, former minister. Son of Haim Landau
 Tommy Lapid, former minister of justice (2003–2004) and leader of Shinui party, Holocaust survivor
 Yair Lapid, former minister of finance, leader of Yesh Atid, son of Tommy Lapid
 Zipora Laskov, founder of public medicine in Israel, elected to third Knesset
 Aliza Lavie, MK
 Pinhas Lavon, former defense minister
 Shalom Levin, former Sec. Gen and President of Israel Teachers union and former Knesset member
 Yitzhak-Meir Levin, former welfare minister 
 David Levy, former foreign minister
 Yitzhak Levy, former minister, leader of Renewed Religious National Zionist party
 Amnon Linn politician and former Knesset member. 
 Zita Linker, founder of liberal party, member of Knesset
 David Libai, former justice minister
 Avigdor Lieberman, former minister
 Amnon Lipkin-Shahak, former Chief of Staff, former tourism minister
 Limor Livnat, member of Knesset, former minister
 Tzipi Livni, Foreign Minister, First Vice Prime Minister (Acting Prime Minister). Daughter of Eitan Livni 
 Kadish Luz, former minister, former Speaker of Knesset

M 
 David Magen, former minister
 Ada Maimon, former member of Knesset, pioneer of women's rights, sister of Yehuda Leib Maimon
 Yehuda Leib Maimon, first minister of religious affairs
 Anat Maor, former MK for Meretz 1992–2003
 Yehoshua Matza, former health minister, today Bonds president 
 Golda Meir (1898–1978), Prime Minister of Israel 1969–1974
 Michael Melchior, former minister, Chief Rabbi of Denmark and Norway 
 Dan Meridor, former finance and justice minister 
 Yaakov Meridor, former minister
 Roni Milo, former minister, mayor of Tel Aviv 1993–1998
 Binyamin Mintz, former minister of communications
 Yitzhak Modai (1926–1998), former finance minister
 Shaul Mofaz, Minister of Transport, former Chief of Staff, defense minister
 Shlomo Molla, MK for Kadima and Hatnuah
 Yitzhak Mordechai, former general, defense minister, leader of Center party

N 
 Peretz Naftali, former minister 
 Mordechai Namir, former labour minister, Histadrut leader and mayor of Tel Aviv
 Ora Namir, former minister, widow of Mordechai Namir
 Yehudit Naot (1944–2004), professor, former environment minister 
 Dan Naveh, Israeli minister, former Cabinet Secretary
 Yitzhak Navon, Fifth President of Israel, former minister
 Yaakov Neeman, former finance and justice minister
 Yuval Ne'eman, scientist, former minister
 Arie Nehemkin, former agriculture minister
 Benjamin Netanyahu (b. 1949), current Likud Party leader, former minister of finance and Prime Minister of Israel 1996–1999
 Moshe Nissim, former finance and justice minister
 Orit Noked, former deputy minister, MK.
 Mordechai Norok, former communications minister

O 
 Ayman Odeh, MK, head of Hadash/Jabha as of 2015, Hadash representative to Haifa City Council 1998–2005
 Avraham Ofer, former construction and housing minister
 Amir Ohana, first openly gay right-wing member of the Knesset
 Asher Ohana, former minister of religious affairs
 Ehud Olmert, former Prime Minister, May 2006–2009
 Zevulun Orlev, former minister of welfare, leader of the National Religious Party
 Haim Oron, former minister of agriculture and rural development

P 
 Yosef Paritzky, former minister of infrastructure, Member of Shinui
 Gideon Pat, former minister, former President of Israel Bonds
 Nathan Peled, former Immigrant Absorption minister
 Shimon Peres (1923–2016), Second Vice Prime Minister, May 2006–, former defense and foreign minister, Prime Minister of Israel in 1977, 1984–1986, 1995–1996; Nobel Peace Prize 1994
 Amir Peretz (b. 1952), Defense Minister May 2006–, Histadrut leader 1995–2005, leader of the Am Ehad party from 1997, which later merged into the Labour party (Avoda), elected to lead Avoda in November 2005
 Yitzhak Haim Peretz, Rabbi, former minister, leader of Shas
 Shoshana Persitz, first female MK at the head of a permanent committee
 Ophir Pines-Paz, former Israeli minister
 Rafael Pinhasi, former minister, member of Shas party
 Alon Pinkas, former Consul General of Israel in the United States
 David-Zvi Pinkas, former minister of transportation
 Avraham Poraz, former Interior minister

R 
 Yitzhak Rabin (1922–1995), former chief of staff, Israeli Prime Minister 1974–1977, 1992–1995; assassinated
 Dalia Rabin-Pelossof, former deputy minister. Daughter of Yitzhak Rabin
 Yehoshua Rabinovich, former finance minister and mayor of Tel Aviv
 Yitzhak Rafael, former minister, son-in-law of Yehuda Leib Maimon
 Haim Ramon, former Histadrut leader, minister
 Yoel Razvozov, MK for Yesh Atid
 Miri Regev, minister of sport and culture
 David Remez, former minister of transportation
 Elimelech Shimon Rimalt, former communications minister
 Reuven Rivlin, former communications minister 2001–2003, Speaker of Knesset
 Yisrael Rokach, former interior minister and mayor of Tel Aviv
 Pinchas Rosen, first justice minister
 Shlomo Rosen, minister of immigrant absorption
 Pnina Rosenblum, cosmetics queen and former MP. 
 Amnon Rubinstein, former minister, now dean in Law school
 Elyakim Rubinstein, former state attorney general, now supreme court judge

S 
 Gideon Sa'ar, Knesset member, former Cabinet Secretary
 Eliezer Sandberg, former minister
 Tova Sanhedrai, former member of Knesset, first religious woman elected
 Pinchas Sapir, former finance minister
 Yosef Sapir, former minister
 Yossi Sarid, former education minister and Knesset Member for Meretz–Yachad
 Eliahu Sasson, former minister
 Ze'ev Scherf, former minister
 Gonen Segev, former minister of infrastructure
 Yosef Serlin, former minister
 Stav Shaffir, youngest female MK in Israeli history
 Moshe Shahal, former minister
 Ayelet Shaked, minister of justice
 Avner Hai Shaki, former minister
 Ilan Shalgi, former minister from Shinui
 Silvan Shalom, former Israeli minister of finance and foreign affairs
 Yitzhak Shamir (b. 1915), former head of Lehi, Prime Minister of Israel 1983–1984, 1986–1992
 Moshe-Haim Shapira, former minister
 Yaakov Shimshon Shapira, former minister
 Yosef Yisrael Shapira, former minister without portfolio from the National Religious Party
 Natan Sharansky former Soviet refusenik, head of the Yisrael B'Aliyah party, former minister.
 Moshe Sharett (1894–1965), Prime Minister of Israel 1953–1955
 Avraham Sharir, former justice minister
 Ariel Sharon (b. 1928), former Prime Minister (2002–2006), general, defense minister
 Zalman Shazar, third President of Israel, former Education minister
 Bechor-Shalom Sheetrit, former police minister
 Meir Sheetrit, MK, former Israeli minister, first elected to Knesset in 1981
 Shimon Shetreet, former minister
 Victor Shem-Tov, former health minister, Secretary General of Mapam 1979–1985
 Avraham Shohat, former finance minister, son-in-law of Levi Eshkol
 Eliezer Shostak, former health minister
 Shalom Simhon, former Israeli minister
 Efraim Sneh, former minister, general. Son of Moshe Sneh
 Moshe Sneh (1909–1972), Israeli politician, leader of Hagana
 Eliahu Suissa, former minister, member of Shas party

T 
 Yitzhak Tabenkin, former leader of the Kibbutz movement, namesake of Yad Tabenkin in Ramat Efal outside of Tel Aviv
 Shmuel Tamir, former justice minister. Son of Bat-Sheva Katznelson
 Yuli Tamir, former immigrant absorption minister 1999–2001
 Salah Tarif, former minister, first druze in the government
 Ahmad Tibi, MK
 Moshe Yaakov Toledano, former religious affairs minister, chief rabbi of Tel Aviv 
 Yair Tzaban, former minister of immigrant absorption 1992–1996, aid to Moshe Sneh
 Aharon Tzizling, former minister
 Yaakov Tzur, former minister

U 
 Aharon Uzan, former minister
 Uzi Eilam, ex-director of Israel's Atomic Energy Commission

V 
 Matan Vilnai, former minister, general

W 
 Zerah Warhaftig, former minister, leader of National Religious Party
 Chaim Weizmann (1874–1952), leading Zionist and scientist, first President of Israel 1949–1952
 Ezer Weizman, seventh President of Israel, former minister, Air Force commander

Y 
 Gad Yaacobi, former minister, ambassador to the United Nations
 Aharon Yadlin, former minister
 Shaul Yahalom, former transportation minister
 Aharon Yariv, former minister, general 
 Eli Yishai, MK, former Deputy Prime Minister and leader of the Shas party 
 Yisrael Yeshayahu, former minister, former Speaker of Knesset
 Dov Yosef, former minister 
 Giora Yoseftal, also known as Giora Josephthal, former minister, husband of Senta Josephtal
 Senetta Yoseftal, also known as Senta Yoseftal and Senta Josephthal former political activist and member of Knesset

Z 
 Haim Joseph Zadok, former minister of justice, trade and industry 
 Rehavam Ze'evi, former general, tourism minister and founder of Moledet (assassinated in October 2001)
 Mordechai Zipori, former general, minister, member of Irgun
 Haneen Zoabi, MK representing the Balad party

See also
 List of Israelis
 List of Knesset members
 List of Likud Knesset Members
 Prime Minister of Israel
 Politics of Israel
 Basic Laws of Israel
 List of political parties in Israel
 List of Knesset speakers

 
Politicians
Israeli politicians